Arnold Oceng, sometimes known as Snakeyman, (born 30 November 1985), is a Ugandan-born British actor and singer. Oceng is best known for the roles in Grange Hill, Adulthood and Brotherhood.

Personal life
He was born on 30 November 1985. In 1986 when he was one year of age, his family moved to Brixton, South London as refugees.

Career
He started acting at the age of 6 as a child artist. In the school, he played the role as 'King Herod' in the play at the Corpus Christi Roman Catholic primary school on Brixton Hill.

In 1999, he made his acting debut as a child artist with the role 'Calvin Braithwaite' in the 73 episodes of BBC children's television drama serial Grange Hill. The series was highly popular and continued until 2004. Since then he acted in minor supportive roles in many television serials including, Casualty, The Bill and Sold. Oceng made his maiden cinema appearance in 2008 film Adulthood. He later followed with supportive roles in independent UK films, 4.3.2.1. and My Brother The Devil.

In 2014, he acted alongside Reese Witherspoon in the film The Good Lie, which became his first Hollywood role. In 2016, he made the role 'Charles' in the film A United Kingdom which had its premier in BFI London Film Festival. Then he starred in the Danish biopic The Greatest Man screened in 2016. In the same year, he joined the cast of film Brotherhood. In 2017, he was nominated for the Male Performance in Film award at Screen Nation Film and Television Awards which was held at the Park Plaza London Riverbank hotel on 7 May 2017. In the same year, he won the award for the Best Supporting Actor at National Film Awards UK for his role in Brotherhood.

Filmography

Film

Television

Awards and nominations

See also
 British Urban Film Festival
 List of African films of 2014

References

External links
 
 Exclusive Q+A With Arnold Oceng on Thursday!
 60 seconds with... Arnold Oceng

Living people
Ugandan emigrants to the United Kingdom
Black British male actors
Ugandan male film actors
1985 births
21st-century British male actors
Male actors from London
British male film actors
People from Brixton